Victory Field is a minor league ballpark in downtown Indianapolis, Indiana, United States. It is home to the Indianapolis Indians of the International League.

History
Victory Field opened on July 11, 1996, with the Indians falling to the Oklahoma City 89ers, 5–3, in front of 14,667 fans. It replaced Bush Stadium, which had also been called Victory Field for 25 years. The new park seated 13,300 fans (15,696 with lawn seating) when it was opened. However, in 2005, a 1,000-seat bleacher section was removed to make room for a picnic area. The name reflects the victory of the United States in World War II. The opening of Victory Field in 1996 was the catalyst for a revitalization of downtown Indianapolis.

A record 16,168 fans were in attendance on July 22, 2000, to witness the Indians lose to the Columbus Clippers 6–5.

The stadium hosted the 2001 Triple-A All-Star Game in which the Pacific Coast League All-Stars defeated the International League All-Stars, 9–5.

The Indiana Hoosiers baseball team has played one game each year at Victory Field since 2015.

The IHSAA uses Victory Field for its state final baseball matches.

In 2021, a six-person panel of American Institute of Architects (AIA) Indianapolis members identified the ballpark to be among the ten most "architecturally significant" buildings completed in the city since World War II.

Features
Victory Field has been recognized as the "Best Minor League Ballpark in America" by Baseball America and Sports Illustrated. It was ranked the sixth-best by Baseball America in their 2015 survey.

The stadium has 12,230 permanent seats and room for 2,000 more fans on the outfield lawn. On popular days such as Independence Day, attendance has exceeded 15,000 including standing room only. Victory Field also features 28 luxury suites, five suite-level party areas, and two picnic areas.

Seating sections include:
Box Seats (Field and View): 7,557
Reserved Level (Upper and Lower): 3,765
Lawn: 2,000
The Coors Light Cove: 125
Suite level: 543
Wheelchair: 240

Sports venues Lucas Oil Stadium, Gainbridge Fieldhouse, the Indiana University Natatorium, and the Michael A. Carroll Track & Soccer Stadium are located nearby.

Seating capacity
The seating capacity has changed over the years:
13,500, 15,696 with lawn seating (1996–2004)
12,500, 14,500 with lawn seating (2005–2010)
12,200, 14,200 with lawn seating (2011)
12,202, 14,202 with lawn seating (2012)
12,230, 14,230 with lawn seating (2013–present)

Improvements
Several changes were made to the ballpark between the 2009 and 2010 seasons. The new digital board, which has the highest resolution (16mm) of any display in Minor League Baseball, features interactive messages, advertisements, and live scores and statistics. The Indians invested approximately $600,000 in the new digital display which was designed by Brookings, South Dakota-based Daktronics.

With the arrival of the 2021 season, the Elements Financial Club opened on the upper level behind home plate. The area offers premium ticket options for up to 200 fans, including access to a climate-controlled interior lounge with a full-service bar.

See also
List of International League stadiums
List of baseball parks in Indianapolis
List of attractions and events in Indianapolis
List of U.S. baseball stadiums by capacity

References

External links

 Info from the official site
 Ballpark Digests Visit to Victory Field
 Victory Field Views – Ball Parks of the Minor Leagues

Indianapolis Indians
Sports venues in Indianapolis
Baseball venues in Indiana
1996 establishments in Indiana
Sports venues completed in 1996
International League ballparks
White River State Park
Populous (company) buildings